Leandro Manuel Emede (born 1980 in San Isidro, Buenos Aires Argentina) is a film editor and director.

He studied graphic design and music video production at the University of Southern California, School of Cinematic Arts in Los Angeles.

From 2006 to 2010 he worked as head of the video department at La Sterpia, the famous Oliviero Toscani studio.

He is the co-founder, with Nicolò Cerioni, of the Milan-based Sugarkane studio. Sugarkane creates music videos, film, live show DVDs, editorials, photos, fashion videos and more.

In September 2013 the critically acclaimed concert film In Questa Notte Fantastica with Lorenzo Jovanotti, directed by both Leandro Manuel Emede and Nicolo Cerioni, was broadcast in primetime on RAI 1, the first channel of Italian television.

Filmography

Director

Live DVD shows 
 LORENZO NEGLI STADI - Backuo tour 
 ORA - Lorenzo Jovanotti live on tour 
 Laura Pausini INEDITO World Tour

Music videos 
 "Ribcage" - Derek Jameson
 "Keep Up" - Country Black
 "Il più grande spettacolo dopo il Big Bang" - Lorenzo Jovanotti 
 "La notte dei desideri" - Lorenzo Jovanotti
 "Fare le valigie" - Luca Carboni
 "Saliva" - Maria Antonietta
 "Davanti agli occhi" - Nesli
 "Quand'ero Giovane" - Franco Battiato
 "Troppo Tempo" - Laura Pausini
 "Ti porto via con me" - Lorenzo Jovanotti
 "Estate" - Lorenzo Jovanotti
 "Raggio di sole" - Lorenzo Jovanotti
 "Se Fué" - Laura Pausini feat. Marc Anthony
 "Similares" - Laura Pausini
 "Dietro un grande amore" - Orietta Berti
 "En la Puerta de al lado / Nella porta accanto" - Laura Pausini
 "A ella debo mi amor" - Laura Pausini
 "Nuestro amor de cada dia" - Laura Pausini

Documentaries and films 
 Anorexia. Storia di un'immagine - with Oliviero Toscani
 Zolfo - with John De Leo
 La Quarta Dimensione - with Lorenzo Jovanotti
 Telesio - with Franco Battiato
 Three days with Monica Bellucci - with Monica Bellucci
 Gucci - Veterans
 Eccentrico - Dolce&Gabbana
 Jovamerican Tour - with Lorenzo Jovanotti
 Forteza Jovanotti - with Lorenzo Jovanotti
 The 20 Greatest Hits - with Laura Pausini

Live shows 
 IN QUESTA NOTTE FANTASTICA - Lorenzo Jovanotti

References

External links
 
 Sugarkane productions
 ANOREXIA. Storia di un'immagine - IMDB
 Progetto La Sterpaia

Argentine film directors
1980 births
Living people